Linden on the Saugus Branch is a 1946 memoir of small-town life written by American novelist Elliot Paul.  It takes place in the Linden neighborhood of Malden, Massachusetts.

See also
Saugus Branch Railroad

References

American autobiographies
Malden, Massachusetts
American memoirs